The France–Italy Maritime Boundary Agreement is a 1986 treaty between France and Italy which delimits the maritime boundary between the two countries in the Strait of Bonifacio.

The Strait of Bonifacio separates the French island of Corsica from the Italian island of Sardinia. The treaty was signed in Paris on 28 November 1986. The boundary set out by the text of the treaty is a relatively short 40 nautical miles long and consists of five straight-line maritime segments defined by six individual coordinate points. The agreed-to boundary is an approximate equidistant line between the two islands.

The treaty came into force on 15 May 1989 after both countries had ratified it. The full name of the treaty is Agreement between the Government of the French Republic and the Government of the Italian Republic on the Delimitation of the Maritime Boundaries in the Area of the Strait of Bonifacio.

Notes

References
 Anderson, Ewan W. (2003). International Boundaries: A Geopolitical Atlas. Routledge: New York. ;  OCLC 54061586
 Charney, Jonathan I., David A. Colson, Robert W. Smith. (2005). International Maritime Boundaries, 5 vols. Hotei Publishing: Leiden. ; ; ; ; ;  OCLC 23254092

External links
Full text of agreement

Treaties concluded in 1986
Treaties entered into force in 1989
1986 in France
1986 in Italy
Boundary treaties
France–Italy border
Bilateral treaties of France
Treaties of Italy
France–Italy relations